Prorophora eberti is a species of snout moth. It is found in Afghanistan.

References

Phycitinae
Moths described in 1959